The Georgian accordion or Georgian Garmoni (Georgian: ქართული გარმონი) is a traditional musical instrument of Georgia. It is especially popular in Tusheti and in Racha. Garmonis can be diatonic or chromatic. This instrument has been modified in the music of different peoples. The result of such adaptation is its variety disseminated in the Caucasus – Caucasian garmoni, Asian garmoni. In the Caucasus garmoni was introduced in the 19th century. The notion Caucasian garmoni is general, as it implies its national varieties, such as: Georgian and Azerbaijani garmonis, Ossetian iron-kandzal-pandir, Adyghean and Kabardyno-Balkarian pshine, Dagestanian komuz. Formation of the Georgian garmoni should have started in the second half of the 19th century. It was made individually in the workshops.

There are three types of Georgian garmoni:
 early – the so-called Tushetian garmoni;
 miniature (buzika, tsiko-tsiko) and
 late – the so-called bass garmoni.

Garmoni can be of different sizes depending on the type and individual customer's request.

History
The Georgian accordion was created in the 19th century, presumably by German colonists who lived in Georgia since 1818.

Structure
Tushetian garmonis are 35 cm high, 17 cm wide; the sizes of tsiko-tsiko are 10 cm / 4 cm, those of bass garmoni 40 cm / 20 cm.

Types
Tushetian garmoni is especially popular in East Georgian mountainous regions, more precisely in Tusheti. This type of Georgian garmoni was formed relatively early. Tushetian garmoni can be both diatonic and chromatic, they have different bass systems. These garmonis basically have 19 basses, however there also are the ones with 12, 11 and 8 basses. As a rule, Tushetian garmoni has 18 diatonic keys. Accordingly chromatic instrument has 12 additional semitone keys. Bass system can also be diatonic or chromatic, Tushetian garmoni has characteristic appearance, but there also are Tushetian garmonis with different design. Most Georgian garmonis have an interesting shutter mechanism – a hook and a loop inside the corpus. It opens when the instrument is moved forward and closes when moved back. Miniature diatonic pocket garmoni (tsiko-tsiko and buzika/muzika) which is visually similar to Georgian traditional garmoni is disseminated in Kartli-Kakheti, East Georgian mountainous regions and Racha. Buzika is a little bigger than Tsiko-tsiko, as a rule, they both have one diatonic octave and 2-3 basses; in some cases they have no bass at all. Later type of Georgian garmoni is the so-called Bass garmoni. It can be said, that it originated as a result of the development of Tushetian garmoni. Unlike the Tushetian garmoni, the bass garmoni has 80 basses, and so its name implies multiplicity of basses. This type of garmoni is larger in size and has 21 diatonic and 14 semitone keys. Its keys are wider as compared to Caucasian garmoni. Tusherian and miniature garmonis have different playing techniques. The technique for Tushetian garmoni is similar in Tusheti and Racha. However, the Tushetian style of musical thinking is more ornamented and melismatic.

Repertoire
Performed on traditional garmoni are dance melodies, lyrical-love, epic and humorous, rarely travelers songs and dirges. There is a footage where the garmoni player plays the ritual song melody standing in the centre of the two storey round dance "Korbeghela". The garmoni does not follow the melody, but has the function of bass. It should be mentioned that in the music of some ethnographic regions garmoni has replaced traditional instruments (such as panduri, chianuri, chiboni). It has become an ensemble instrument in the city. Unlike the instruments introduced from abroad (mandolin, guitar, dududki, zurna), garmoni underwent serious changes in Georgia – acquired original form and appearance. This fact and almost two hundred years of garmoni in Georgia allows to boldly declare.

See also
 Music of Georgia (country)

References 
 Nikoloz Jokhadze, Georgian Harmonic, Journal Musika, 2016 N4 / ნიკოლოზ ჯოხაძე, ქართული გარმონი (სახეობები, ოსტატები, დაკვრის ტექნიკა) ჟურ. მუსიკა 2016 N4;

External links
 musika, Journal of Creative Union of Composers of Georgia, 2016 N4
 http://polyphony.ge/wp-content/uploads/2016/04/22-Eng.pdf

Musical instruments of Georgia (country)
Accordion